Eric Andersson (born 15 June 1984) is a former motorcycle speedway rider from Sweden.

Career
Andersson came to prominence when he reached the final of the 2004 Speedway Under-21 World Championship.

In 2006, he joined the Oxford Cheetahs to ride in the 2006 Elite League speedway season. The following season he resigned for the Cheetahs but the club withdrew from the league but Andersson continued to ride for Rospiggarna in Sweden and in Grudziądz in Poland.

He rode one heat in 2007 Speedway Grand Prix of Sweden, when he replaced injured Wiesław Jaguś in Heat 19.

After finishing his career in Britain Andersson concentrated on the Team Speedway Polish Championship and rode from 2010 to 2014 for Kolejarz Rawicz in the Polish Speedway First League and Polish Speedway Second League respectively.

Speedway Grand Prix results

Career details

World Championships 
 Individual World Championship (Speedway Grand Prix)
 2006 - track reserve
 2007 - 37th place (0 points in one event)
 Individual U-21 World Championship
 2004 -  Wrocław - 13th place (5 points)
 Team U-21 World Championship
 2005 -  Pardubice - Runner-up (8 points)

European Championships 

 Individual European Championship
 2007 -  Wiener Neustadt - track reserve
 Individual U-19 European Championship
 2000 -  Ljubljana - 13th place (5 points)
 2003 -  Pocking - 10th place (6 points)

See also 
 Sweden national speedway team
 List of Speedway Grand Prix riders
 Speedway in Sweden

References 

Swedish speedway riders
1984 births
Living people
Oxford Cheetahs riders